The 1936 Bowling Green Falcons football team was an American football team that represented Bowling Green State College (later renamed Bowling Green State University) in the Ohio Athletic Conference (OAC) during the 1936 college football season. In their second season under head coach Harry Ockerman, the Falcons compiled a 4–2–3 record (2–1–3 against OAC opponents), finished in 11th place out of 19 teams in the OAC, and outscored opponents by a total of 66 to 60. James Inman was the team captain.

Schedule

References

Bowling Green
Bowling Green Falcons football seasons
Bowling Green Falcons football